This is a list of major parks, gardens, and nature reserves in Brisbane, Queensland, Australia.

References

External links

 Brisbane parks and gardens

 
Parks
Brisbane
Lists of tourist attractions in Queensland
Brisbane
Brisbane